Jones Mill Branch is a  long second-order tributary to Marshyhope Creek in Sussex County, Delaware.

Course
Jones Mill Branch rises on the Bridgeville Branch divide about 0.5 miles northeast of Jacobs Crossroads, Delaware, and then flows generally west-northwest to join Marshyhope Creek about 1.5 miles east-northeast of Smithville, Maryland.

Watershed
Jones Mill Branch drains  of area, receives about 44.8 in/year of precipitation, and is about 6.55% forested.

See also
List of rivers of Delaware

References

Rivers of Delaware
Rivers of Sussex County, Delaware